Souleymane Cissé (born 2 August 1990) is a Senegalese professional footballer who plays as a midfielder for Championnat National 2 club Louhans-Cuiseaux.

Club career
Cissé began his career with the Senegalese club Diambars, having stayed with them from 2008 to 2014. On 18 August 2014, he transferred to France with Louhans-Cuiseaux.

International career
Cissé debuted for the Senegal national team in a 1–0 friendly loss to Mexico on 10 May 2010.

References

External links
 
 
 

1990 births
Living people
People from Dakar Region
Senegalese footballers
Association football midfielders
Diambars FC players
Louhans-Cuiseaux FC players
Senegal Premier League players
Championnat National 2 players
Championnat National 3 players
Senegal international footballers
Senegalese expatriate footballers
Senegalese expatriate sportspeople in France
Expatriate footballers in France